The Cambodia–Vietnam border is the international border between the territory of Cambodia and Vietnam. The border is 1,158 km (720 m) in length and runs from the tripoint with Laos in the north to Gulf of Thailand in the south.

Description
The border starts in the north at the tripoint with Laos and then proceeds overland to the south, occasionally utilising rivers such as the Tonlé San. It then turns in a broad arc to the south-west, except for the Cambodian protrusion known as the Parrot's Beak, running mostly overland but also at times using rivers such as the Vàm Cỏ Đông and the Saigon. After cutting across the Mekong delta it continues southwestwards, terminating at the Gulf of Thailand just west of Hà Tiên. The maritime boundary forms a loop, so Phú Quốc island belongs to Vietnam despite it being closer to the Cambodia shore.

History

Vietnamese people gradually migrated from northern Vietnam southwards during the 10th - 18th centuries, eventually bringing them into contact with the Khmer kingdom. Relations were often tense, with Vietnam frequently invading Cambodian lands; in 1857 a joint Siamese-Vietnamese protectorate was established over Cambodia. From the 1860s France began establishing a presence in the region, initially in modern Cambodia and Vietnam, and the colony of French Indochina was created in 1887, also including Laos. A partial boundary between Cambodia and Cochinchina (southern Vietnam) in its southernmost section by the Gulf coast was drawn by the French in 1868-69 and then ratified in 1870. This boundary was then modified slightly in 1873. In 1904 Đắk Lắk was transferred from Laos to Annam (central Vietnam) and Stung Treng province transferred from Laos to Cambodia, with the rest of the Cambodia-Vietnam boundary as far north as the Srepok River then being delimited. Various small adjustments were made to the alignment after this in the years 1914, 1932, 1933, 1935 and 1936. In 1939 Jules Brévié, Governor-General of French Indochina, divided the islands in the Gulf of Thailand on a purely administrative basis with the so-called 'Brévié line', however a scheduled allocation of the islands between Cambodia and Vietnam never took place. In 1942 another small adjustment to the frontier was made in the vicinity of the Bassac River.

In 1954 both Cambodia and Vietnam gained full independence, however the latter was split into a Communist North and a capitalist South, with Cambodia bordering South Vietnam only. The border remained undemarcated and numerous areas, as well as the Gulf islands, remained in dispute. Furthermore, Khmer nationalists laid claim to much of the Mekong delta area of southern Vietnam (called 'Kampuchea Krom'), based on the fact that historically these were Khmer lands.

During the Vietnam War the border was crossed by Viet Cong supply lines, most notably the southern stretch of the Ho Chi Minh Trail, causing it to be heavily bombed by American forces. In return for tolerating the Viet Cong presence along the border, Cambodia attempted to extract territorial concessions, though with little success. In 1975 the nationalist-Communist Khmer Rouge took over Cambodia and made gaining some or all of Kampuchea Krom a priority. A brief Khmer invasion occurring the day after Saigon fell to North Vietnam was repulsed, and border discussions then took place from 1976 to 1977. With relations deteriorating numerous skirmishes occurred along the border, with Vietnam eventually invading Cambodia in 1978 and ousting the Khmer Rouge. Discussions on the border thereafter reconvened in 1983, with both sides in 1985 pledging to recognise the border as it was at independence. Discussions continued into the early 1990s. A treaty was signed in 2005, followed by on-the-ground demarcation, which was completed in 2012.

Border crossings

There are several border crossings:
 Oyadav (Ou Ya Dav, Ratanakiri, Cambodia) – Lệ Thanh (Đức Cơ, Gia Lai, Vietnam)
 Bavet (Bavet, Svay Rieng, Cambodia) – Mộc Bài (Bến Cầu, Tây Ninh, Vietnam)
 Kaam Samnor (Leuk Daek, Kandal, Cambodia) – Vĩnh Xương (Tân Châu, An Giang, Vietnam)
 Phnom Den (Kiri Vong, Takéo, Cambodia) – Tịnh Biên (Tịnh Biên, An Giang, Vietnam)
 Prek Chak (Kampong Trach, Kampot, Cambodia) – Hà Tiên (Hà Tiên, Kiên Giang, Vietnam)

See also
 Cambodia–Vietnam relations

References

 Cambodia-Vietnam border
border
Borders of Cambodia
Borders of Vietnam
International borders